Jean Petit may refer to:

 Jean Petit (footballer, born 1949), French footballer
 Jean Petit (footballer, born 1914) (1914–1944), Belgian footballer
 Jean Petit (theologian) (died 1411), French theologian
 Jean Louis Petit (1674–1750), French surgeon and inventor of a screw type tourniquet
 Jean Robert Petit, French paleoclimatologist
 Jean-Claude Petit (born 1943), French composer and arranger
 Jean Claude Petit (1819 – 1903), French sculptor
 Jean Petit (printer) or Jehan Petit, French printer in the 15th and 16th centuries

See also 
 John Petit (disambiguation)